Magnolia omeiensis is a species of plant in the family Magnoliaceae. It is endemic to China.  It is threatened by habitat loss.

References

omeiensis
Endemic flora of China
Critically endangered plants
Taxonomy articles created by Polbot